Douglas R. Worsnop (born 1 November 1952) is an American atmosphere and hydrospheric scientist, a significant figure in his field, currently at Aerodyne Research and an Elected Fellow of the American Association for the Advancement of Science and the Finnish Society of Sciences and Letters.

References

American atmospheric scientists
Fellows of the American Association for the Advancement of Science
Living people
1952 births